Adnan Akmal (Urdu, ; born 13 March 1985) is a former international Pakistani cricketer. He is a right-handed batsman and wicket-keeper who plays for Zarai Taraqiati Bank Ltd Cricket Team and has represented his country at U-17 level. He was called up for Pakistan's tour against South Africa in the UAE, as a replacement for the first choice keeper, Zulqarnain Haider. His brothers, Kamran Akmal and Umar Akmal, both had central contracts with the Pakistan Cricket Board, and were regular fixtures in the national side. Adnan made his Test debut against South Africa on 12 November 2010.

Domestic career
In April 2018, he was named in Sindh's squad for the 2018 Pakistan Cup. In March 2019, he was named in Khyber Pakhtunkhwa's squad for the 2019 Pakistan Cup.

In September 2019, he represented Southern Punjab in the 2019–20 Quaid-e-Azam Trophy tournament. In January 2021, he was a part of Balochistan's squad for the 2020–21 Pakistan Cup.

International career 
Adnan was added to the Pakistan's Test squad in replacement of Zulqarnain Haider, who announced his retirement from the international cricket after allegedly receiving threats from bookies. In the series against New Zealand, he performed well to occupy his place in the future. He was Pakistan A's wicket keeper.

References

External links

1985 births
Living people
Lahore cricketers
Adnan
Sui Northern Gas Pipelines Limited cricketers
Pakistani cricketers
Pakistan Test cricketers
Pakistan One Day International cricketers
Lahore Eagles cricketers
Zarai Taraqiati Bank Limited cricketers
Lahore Whites cricketers
Lahore Blues cricketers
Punjab (Pakistan) cricketers
Cricketers from Lahore
Southern Punjab (Pakistan) cricketers
Wicket-keepers
People from Lahore